Deepak Puri is the founder, chairman and managing director of Moser Baer, which was liquidated in 2018 due to insolvency.

Puri initially worked as junior executive with the oil company ESSO –  in 1962 at Kolkata, and later with Shalimar Paints. In 1964, Puri floated his first company, Metal Industries in Calcutta, trading in aluminum wires and furniture. Two years later, he moved into manufacturing as well. Due to labour issues at Calcutta, he decided to migrate to New Delhi in 1983, where he started Moser Baer India joint venture with Switzerland-based Moser Baer.

Education
Puri holds  from Imperial College, London, and completed his education from St. Stephen's College and Modern School, New Delhi. He was also conferred the degree of Doctor of Philosophy (D.Phil.), honoris causa, in recognition to his exemplary efforts by the Amity University.

Award
 Padma Shri award for his contribution to the growth of Indian industry in January 2010.
 ‘the Electronics Man of the Year 2002’ recognition from ELCINA.
 ‘the IT Man of the Year’ by top IT publication Dataquest.
 ‘the Entrepreneur of the Year’ award.
 ‘Innovator of the year’ by CNBC-TV18 for the year 2009.

References

Businesspeople from Delhi
Living people
Recipients of the Padma Shri in trade and industry
Year of birth missing (living people)